William McCaw "Red" Ballantyne (15 November 1901 – 1944) was a Scottish association football inside right who played in Scotland, the United States, and Canada.

Ballantyne played for both Morton and Clyde, before jumping to the Boston Soccer Club of the American Soccer League in 1924. He was back in Scotland with Clyde a year later. After two seasons with Clyde, Ballantyne returned to the United States to sign with the New Bedford Whalers. In 1928, he began the season with the Whalers, but the onset of the soccer wars between the league and the United States Football Association brought considerable turmoil to the professional scene. The Whalers briefly left the ASL for the newly created outlaw league, the Eastern Soccer League. After a handful of games, it returned to the ASL. However, Ballantyne refused to make the move back to the ASL and joined the New York Giants in the ESL. This move occurred by December 1928. He remained with the Giants after the ASL merged with the ESL in 1930. In the fall of 1930, Ballantyne joined the Brooklyn Wanderers. He then signed with the New York Americans and later played for Montréal Carsteel and then the Kearny Scots-Americans in the second ASL after the original league collapsed in 1933. He was with the Newark Germans in 1935 as a player-manager.

His elder brother Johnny and younger brother Bobby were also footballers who played for clubs in Scotland and the United States.

External links

References

1901 births
1944 deaths
Date of death missing
American Soccer League (1921–1933) players
American Soccer League (1933–1983) players
Boston Soccer Club players
Brooklyn Wanderers players
Clyde F.C. players
Eastern Professional Soccer League (1928–29) players
Glasgow United F.C. players
Kearny Scots-Americans players
Newark Germans players
New York Americans (soccer) (1930–1933) players
New York Giants (soccer) players
Scottish footballers
Scottish Football League players
Scottish Junior Football Association players
Footballers from Glasgow
Scottish expatriate footballers
Scottish football managers
Scottish expatriate football managers
British expatriates in Canada
British expatriate sportspeople in the United States